Chattanooga is a city in the U.S. state of Tennessee.

Chattanooga may refer to:

Places in the United States:
 Chattanooga, Ohio, an unincorporated community
 Chattanooga, Oklahoma, a town
 Chattanooga Creek, a stream in Georgia and Tennessee
 Chattanooga Valley, Georgia

In the military:
 Battle of Chattanooga (disambiguation), three different engagements during the American Civil War in 1862 and 1863
 , four United States Navy ships

Sports teams:
 Chattanooga Lookouts, a minor league baseball team currently affiliated with the Minnesota Twins
 Chattanooga Mocs, the sports teams at the University of Tennessee at Chattanooga
 Chattanooga Black Lookouts, a former Negro league baseball team

In music:
 Chattanooga (band), Swedish pop trio
 Chattanooga Choo Choo, is a 1941 song written by Mack Gordon and composed by Harry Warren

See also
 Chattooga (disambiguation)